Mona Williams (born Vermona March Goodwyn; March 26, 1905 – December 5, 1991) was an American novelist and poet, best known as the author of the novelette from which the 1954 feature film, Woman's World, was adapted. She also contributed articles, fiction and poetry to magazines including The Writer, McCall's, Ladies Home Journal and Cosmopolitan.

Early life
Mona Williams was born in Rutland, Vermont, the first of five children born to Wirt Goodwyn and Mabel Alice Trask. She was raised in Massachusetts, initially Springfield and later Northampton, where she attended private school.

Career
Williams's first novel Here Are My Children was generally well received. Novelist Julian Street judged it "quite a surprising performance for so young a writer," while poet Isidor Schneider, reviewing the book for the New York Herald Tribune, observed:

For much of her career, William's star was eclipsed by that of her celebrated namesake, Mrs. Harrison Williams (the former Mona Bush, née Strader), most notably in 1937 when her work was erroneously attributed by no less prestigious a publication than Time Magazine:

In 1952, 20th Century Fox purchased Williams' story, May the Best Wife Win, originally published in the July 1950 issue of McCall's.

Whatever boost to Williams' public profile may have resulted from her connection to the 1954 feature film Woman's World appears to have been largely offset by the studio's decision to relocate the film's action to New York City. As she herself noted:

In the nineteen sixties, two more projected screen adaptations of Williams novels were announced, neither of which came to fruition. In 1963, MGM purchased the rights to Williams' not-yet completed novel, The Company Girls, with Joe Pasternak to produce and screenwriter George Wells to do the adaptation. Whether or not that adaptation was completed, the film was never made. In the summer of 1965, it was reported that former film writer-producer Felix Jackson had acquired the rights to Williams's novel Faces at a Window, with Jackson himself slotted to do the adaptation. No more was heard of the project, nor was any novel of that name published, though perhaps this was the novel eventually published in 1968 as Voices in the Dark.

Personal life and death
In December 1929, roughly six years after having hed her first completed novel rejected by him, Mona Goodwyn married editor, publisher and author Henry Meade Williams (the son of novelist and playwright Jesse Lynch Williams), with whom she had three children.

Williams died of a stroke on December 5, 1991, at Community Hospital of the Monterey Peninsula, having been predeceased by her husband in 1979. Her cremated remains were scattered in the waters off Trout Island, near Harrington, Maine, as had been her husband's.

List of works

 Here Are My Children (1932)
 Bright Is the Morning (1934)
 May the Best Wife Win (1950)
 "The Man With Three Faces" (1951)
 Dream Pictures (1952)
 Invitation to Breakfast: A Comedy in One Act (1955)
 Yesterday's Innocents (1956)
 The Marriage (1958; aka The Passion of Amy Styron, 1965)
 The Hot Breath of Heaven (1961), poems
 The Company Girls (1965)
 Celia (1968)
 Voices in the Dark (1968)
 The Messenger (1977)
 This House Is Burning (1978)

References

Further reading
 Goodwyn, Mona (March 2, 1928). "Cal It a Day: 'Greek and Greek'". Harrisburg Telegraph. p. 8
 Goodwyn, Mona (March 28, 1928). "From a Scrap Book: 'Cynic'". Kingsport Times. p. 8
 Goodwyn, Mona (May 8, 1928). "Call It a Day: 'Communion'" Harrisburg Telegraph.
 Goodwyn, Mona (August 5, 1928). "My Mind Was a Cold House". The Birmingham News.
 Goodwyn, Mona (March 6, 1928). "Low Tide". New York Herald Tribune. Reprinted in The American Scrap Book: The Year's Golden Harvest of Thought and Achievement (1928)
 "Author Sees Old Problem in New Light". The Oklahoma News. December 2, 1932. p. 10
 Williams, Mona Godwyn (May 13, 1934). "The Liar". The Fresno Bee.
 “Cast Announced for Lions Play”. ‘’The Carmel Pine Cone-Combal’’. May 14, 1948. p. 3
 "Previewing Mona's Movie". The Carmel Pine Cone. November 5, 1954. p. 11e
 Hopper, Hedda (May 23, 1954). "Hollywood: Author Got Small Sum for Expensive Hollywood Film". The Tampa Tribune.
 Lindeman, Edith (December 1, 1954). "Writer Finds One Sale to Movies Doesn't Make a Millionaire of Her". Richmond Times-Dispatch. p. 17
 "All-Carmel Panel of Writers". The Carmel Pine Cone. p. 1
 "Mona Williams Is First in San Marino after Peanut War". The Carmel Pine Cone. October 31, 1957. p. 1
 Williams, Mona (May 1, 1958). “Beyond Human Knowledge ‘Pulls the Mind Outward’”. ‘’The Carmel Pine Cone-Cymbal’’. p. 5
 Wegars, Don (February 25, 1962). "Burroughs' Cut-Up Works and Stabs at Swinging Art". The San Francisco Examiner Highlight. p. 5
 Jervey, Phyllis (July 21, 1966). "Party Plans: Henry and Mona Read and Write". The Carmel Pine Cone-Cymbal. p. 8
 “Story in February Issue of Cosmo”. ‘’The Carmel Pine Cone-Cymbal’’. February 1, 1968. p. 2
 Lloyd, Frank (April 14, 1977). "Once Upon a Time". The Carmel Pine Cone. pp. 2, 4
 Drizari, Nelo (December 8, 1977). "The Literati of Carmel". The Carmel Pine Cone. pp. 8–9
 Norberg, Gunnar (December 22, 1983). "The Conscience of Carmel: Recording Our History". The Carmel Pine Cone. p. A-21

External links
 Works by Mona Goodwyn Williams at WorldCat
 

1905 births
1991 deaths
American women novelists
People from Rutland, Vermont
Writers from Northampton, Massachusetts
People from Carmel-by-the-Sea, California
20th-century American novelists
20th-century American women writers
Novelists from Massachusetts
Novelists from California